Riverside Farm may refer to:

Riverside Farm (Erwinna, Pennsylvania), listed on the National Register of Historic Places in Bucks County, Pennsylvania
River Side Farmhouse, Shelbyville, Tennessee, listed on the National Register of Historic Places in Bedford County, Tennessee
Riverside Farm (Walter Hill, Tennessee), listed on the National Register of Historic Places in Rutherford County, Tennessee
Riverside Farm (Nelson County, Virginia), a historic farm complex